The 1925 Washington Senators won 96 games, lost 55, and finished in first place in the American League. Fueled by the excitement of winning their second AL pennant, the Senators led 3 games to 1 in the World Series before succumbing to the Pittsburgh Pirates.

On September 28, the Senators were guests of President Calvin Coolidge at the White House, becoming the first reigning World Series champions to visit the White House.

Regular season

Season standings

Record vs. opponents

Roster

Player stats

Batting

Starters by position 
Note: Pos = Position; G = Games played; AB = At bats; H = Hits; Avg. = Batting average; HR = Home runs; RBI = Runs batted in

Other batters 
Note: G = Games played; AB = At bats; H = Hits; Avg. = Batting average; HR = Home runs; RBI = Runs batted in

Pitching

Starting pitchers 
Note: G = Games pitched; IP = Innings pitched; W = Wins; L = Losses; ERA = Earned run average; SO = Strikeouts

Other pitchers 
Note: G = Games pitched; IP = Innings pitched; W = Wins; L = Losses; ERA = Earned run average; SO = Strikeouts

Relief pitchers 
Note: G = Games pitched; W = Wins; L = Losses; SV = Saves; ERA = Earned run average; SO = Strikeouts

References 

 1925 Washington Senators at Baseball-Reference
 1925 Washington Senators team page at www.baseball-almanac.com

Minnesota Twins seasons
Washington Senators season
American League champion seasons
Washing